Adriana Lovera Varela (born 20 September 1985) is a road cyclist from Venezuela. She represented her nation at the 2008 UCI Road World Championships.

References

External links
 profile at Procyclingstats.com

1985 births
Venezuelan female cyclists
Living people
Place of birth missing (living people)
Competitors at the 2006 Central American and Caribbean Games